Leon Gordon (born 1 July 1974) is a former Jamaican sprinter who competed in the men's 100m competition at the 1996 Summer Olympics. He recorded a 10.48, not enough to qualify for the next round past the heats. His personal best is 10.19, set in 1996. He was also on the 1996 Jamaican men's 4 × 100 m relay team, which won its heat, and was subsequently disqualified in the semifinal round.

References

1974 births
Jamaican male sprinters
Athletes (track and field) at the 1996 Summer Olympics
Olympic athletes of Jamaica
Living people
Central American and Caribbean Games medalists in athletics